KPO may refer to:
 KPO, former call sign of San Francisco radio station KNBR (AM)
  (Communist Party of Austria), an Austrian political party
 ) (Communist Party of Germany (Opposition) (1928–1940), former German political party
 Knight of the Pian Order (Order of Pope Pius IX), lowest rank in that papal order of knighthood
 Knowledge process outsourcing, a business practice
 Ku-ring-gai Philharmonic Orchestra, an amateur orchestra in New South Wales, Australia
 KPO, IATA code for Pohang Airport, South Korea
 Karachaganak Petroleum Operating, operator of the Karachaganak Field in Kazakhstan